VIA is an abbreviation for Vocal and Instrumental Ensemble. It is the general name used for pop and rock bands that were formally recognized by the Soviet government from the 1960s to the 1980s. 

In Soviet times, the term VIA generally meant , but it is now used in Russia to refer specifically to pop, rock, and folk groups active during the Soviet period. In the Polish People's Republic and some other neighbouring satellite states of the USSR the term big-beat was used instead.

History

The term VIA appeared in the Soviet Union in the 1960s and represented a model under which the Soviet government was willing to permit domestic rock and pop music acts to develop. To break through to the state-owned Soviet media, a band needed to become an officially recognized VIA. Each VIA had an artistic director who served as manager, producer, and state-appointed censor. In some bands (such as Pesniary) the artistic director was the band's leading member and songwriter, while in others he played the role of impresario.

Soviet VIAs played a specific style of pop music. They performed youth-oriented (but officially approved) radio-friendly music, which combined contemporary Western and Soviet trends. Folk instruments were often used, and occasionally a keytar (a keyboard held like a guitar). Songs varied from pop ballads, dance-beat disco and new wave to mainstream rock. Many VIAs had up to ten members (including a number of vocalists and multi-instrumentalists), who were in frequent rotation. 

Due to state censorship, the lyrics of VIAs were family-friendly; typical topics were universal emotions like love, joy, and nostalgia, or idealized vignettes from daily life. Many bands also encouraged national culture and patriotism, (especially those of national minorities from the smaller Soviet republics) such as Yalla from Uzbekistan, Labyrinth from Georgia and Chervona Ruta from Ukraine. Folk-based VIAs such as Pesniary (later they mixed folk rock and progressive rock styles), Siabry and Verasy were especially popular in Belarus. Russian bands from Moscow and Leningrad (such as Zemlyane and Tsvety) were more oriented towards Western pop and rock music.

Many VIAs were created by musicians that played together in local choruses or musical theatrical productions. The earliest VIAs included Avangard (Avantgarde) in 1964, Poyushchiye Gitary (The Singing Guitars) in 1966, Vesyolye Rebyata (Jolly Fellows) in 1968, and Dobry Molodtsy (Good Guys) in 1969.

Unique characteristics

The typical VIA consisted of six to ten band members, with several singers and musicians capable of playing multiple instruments. Lead vocalists in VIAs usually did not play an instrument, but only sang. Virtually every member of a VIA was a professional musician with formal musical education and many years of performance experience. All the members were part of the federal or republican Union of Composers and alumni of conservatories or music schools.

The Soviet government had strict rules governing how members of a VIA were to behave on stage and conduct themselves in public. Movement around the stage was discouraged. Musicians typically remained in one place as they played their instruments or sang. Anything outside of the conservative "norm", such as tattoos, leather jackets, or metallic accessories were forbidden.

VIA song recordings were done by the state-owned record company Melodiya (Melody). Concerts and performances were organized by professional associations such as Soyuzkontsert (Union Concerts), Moskontsert (Moscow Concerts), Lenkonsert (Leningrad Concerts), Roskontsert (Russian Concerts), and Goskontsert (Government Concerts), along with regional orchestra groups.

At times, a VIA would collaborate with a well-known solo singer to provide musical backing. Examples include Yury Antonov and VIAs Araks and Aerobus, Alla Pugacheva and VIA Retsital, Sofia Rotaru and VIA Chervona Ruta, Valeriy Obodzinskiy and VIA Verniye Druziya, and Lev Leschenko and VIA Spektr.

Repertoire
VIAs typically performed songs written by professional composers and lyricists who were members in good standing of the Composers' Union and the Writers' Union in the former Soviet Union. Some songs were created by VIA members or the VIA's artistic director. In the early 1980s, there was an unspoken rule that at least 80% of a VIA's performance repertoire had to be songs written by union members.

VIAs performed songs in a range of musical styles, including folk music, disco, rock, and synth-pop. Although tightly controlled by the government, VIAs had an enormous influence on the Russian public and created an audience for the rock music wave that followed. On the other hand, VIAs tended to deliver songs that were mainstream, simple in expression, and conservative in performance. Lyrics tended to focus on uncontroversial topics such as patriotic motifs, love stories, idealizations of work, light humour, ballads, current events, and folk themes. Any social criticism or protest was heavily censored and largely forbidden, except when directed against the West.

A number of VIAs did cover versions of foreign hits, typically changing the lyrics to entirely different meanings, but matching the music and vocalization. At times, VIAs went so far as to claim that the music was their own original work.

Rise and fall
VIAs as a movement in Soviet music existed for approximately two decades, from the mid-1960s until the mid-1980s. They were very popular, particularly among Soviet youth. The best known VIAs would perform year round, giving several concerts a day. Many of these concerts received television and radio air time. Their albums sold tens of millions of copies. 

Most VIAs dissolved in the late 1980s. This was in part due to rock music becoming more popular and the censorship apparatus largely falling apart. The advent of synthesizers, samplers, and other technologies that enabled the creation of music without the use of a large number of musicians was also a contributing factor. Finally, the lyrical content of VIA songs became far less relevant in the new, more open society.

Although most VIAs disappeared, a number of VIA members enjoyed successful subsequent careers as solo performers or members of new bands. Many Russian pop and rock stars of the 1990s were VIA members in the 1970s and 1980s. A few of the most popular VIAs endured and continued to exist into the 1990s and thereafter, usually with a significantly different membership.

Bands 
Groups exemplifying VIA music included: 
Ariel
Dos Mukasan
Iveria
Pesniary
Poyushchiye Gitary ("Singing Guitars")
Samotsvety
Tsvety ("Flowers")
Verasy
Vesyolye Rebyata ("Jolly Fellows")
Yalla
Zemlyane ("Earthlings")

See also
Big-beat (Eastern Bloc)
Franciszek Walicki
Niebiesko-Czarni

External links

English
 The trends that led to modern Russian music: Romance, Bards, VIAs.

Russian
 Articles on VIA history
 A list of VIAs
 VIA era fan site
 VIA biographies

Videos
 1960-80's Soviet music videos

References

Soviet music